Alferaki Palace is a museum in Taganrog, Russia, originally the home of the wealthy merchant Nikolay Alferaki. It was built in 1848 by the architect Andrei Stackenschneider on Frunze Street (formerly Katolicheskaya), in downtown Taganrog.

The building is decorated with a portal featuring four Corinthian columns and stucco moulding in the baroque style. A suite of rooms was created inside, along with a spacious music hall with a ceiling-painting.

History
The first owners of the palace were Nikos Alferakis, who was born in Taganrog and his family.
Mikhail Shchepkin stayed in Alferaki Palace in July 1863. In the 1870s, after the Alferaki family went bankrupt, the palace was sold to the Greek merchant Negroponte. Its garden was sold to the merchant community. It re-opened as the Commercial Assembly. Anton Chekhov (as a student of The Boys Gymnasium) visited concerts given at the commercial club in 1876, and he later mentioned the palace in his stories Ionych, Mask and My life.

From February to April 1918, the mansion became the headquarters of the Soviet Workers' council of Taganrog.

Later during occupation in 1918 it housed the German war hospital, and in 1919 – Anton Ivanovich Denikin's staff.

After the establishment of Soviet power in Taganrog, the building accommodated various institutions. After 1927 it housed the Museum of Regional Studies (founded in 1898 by Anton Chekhov).

During the Occupation of Taganrog, the whole collection of Russian art, as well as 339 other art objects were looted by German occupation authorities
.

Alferaki Palace was renovated in 1991–1996 and is now open to public as the Museum of Regional Studies, though it is more commonly known under the name Alferaki Palace.

The spacious hall with amazing acoustics is also used by the Municipality for official ceremonies, especially the Mayor of Taganrog's annual ceremony to honor the best school graduates.

Views of the palace

Museum's collection
The basis of museum collections is formed with funds related to famous historical or artistic personalities, including authentic personal belongings of the Russian tsars Alexander I of Russia and Peter I of Russia, playwright and poet Nestor Kukolnik, the founder of Russian heraldry Alexander Lakier, the great actress Faina Ranevskaya, author of children's books Ivan Vasilenko, romantic composer Achilles Alferaki, general Paul von Rennenkampf and many more.

See also
Achilles Alferaki
Sergei Alphéraky
History of Taganrog
List of people in Taganrog

External links
  Taganrog Arts & Culture Council, Municipal website

References
 Taganrog Encyclopedia (Энциклопедия Таганрога), 2nd edition, Taganrog, 2003

Palaces in Russia
Local museums in Russia
Buildings and structures in Taganrog
Houses completed in 1848
Baroque Revival architecture
Museums established in 1927
Museums in Taganrog
Historic house museums in Russia
Cultural heritage monuments in Taganrog
Cultural heritage monuments of federal significance in Rostov Oblast